The 2014 FIFA World Cup qualification was a series of tournaments organised by the six FIFA confederations. The 2014 FIFA World Cup featured 32 teams, with one place reserved for the host nation, Brazil. The remaining 31 places were determined by a qualification process, in which the other 207 teams, from the six FIFA confederations, competed. Most of the successful teams were determined within these confederations, with a limited number of inter-confederation play-offs occurring at the end of the process.

Bhutan, Brunei, Guam and Mauritania did not enter, and South Sudan joined FIFA after the qualification process started and therefore could not take part. The qualification process consisted of 820 matches, reduced from 828 after the late withdrawals of the Bahamas and Mauritius.

The first qualification match, between Montserrat and Belize, was played on 15 June 2011, and the Belizean striker Deon McCaulay scored the first goal in qualification. Qualification ended on 20 November 2013, when Uruguay eliminated Jordan to become the final qualifier for the World Cup. Twenty-three of FIFA's 24 top-ranked countries eventually qualified.

Qualified teams

Qualification process

The FIFA Executive Committee decided to approve the change of date for the preliminary draw of the 2014 FIFA World Cup, which was held six months earlier than in the past, to allow the confederations to begin their qualifying competitions in good time. The draw was held on 30 July 2011 at the Marina da Glória in Rio de Janeiro, Brazil.

The distribution by confederation for the 2014 FIFA World Cup is:
 AFC (Asia): 4 or 5 places
 CAF (Africa): 5 places
 CONCACAF (North, Central American and Caribbean): 3 or 4 places
 CONMEBOL (South America): 4 or 5 places (+ Brazil qualified automatically as host nation for a total of 5 or 6 places)
 OFC (Oceania): 0 or 1 place(s)
 UEFA (Europe): 13 places

UEFA and CAF have a guaranteed number of places, whereas the number of qualifiers from other confederations is dependent on play-offs between AFC's fifth-placed team and CONMEBOL's fifth-placed team, and between CONCACAF's fourth-placed team and OFC's first-placed team. A draw determined the pairings between the four teams involved.

After the first round of 2014 FIFA World Cup finals, the percentage of teams from each confederation that passed through to the round of 16 was as follows:
 AFC (Asia): 0% (0 of 4 places)
 CAF (Africa): 40% (2 of 5 places)
 CONCACAF (North, Central American and Caribbean): 75% (3 of 4 places)
 CONMEBOL (South America): 83% (5 of 6 places)
 OFC (Oceania): n/a (0 of 0 places)
 UEFA (Europe): 46% (6 of 13 places)

Summary of qualification

Tiebreakers
For FIFA World Cup qualifying stages using a league format, the method used for separating teams level on points was the same for all confederations. If teams were even on points at the end of group play, the tied teams were ranked by:
 Goal difference in all group matches
 Greater number of goals scored in all group matches
 Greater number of points obtained in matches between the tied teams
 Goal difference in matches between the tied teams
 Greater number of goals scored in matches between the tied teams
 Greater number of away goals scored in matches between the tied teams if only two teams were tied
If teams were still equal after applying all listed tiebreakers, then a single play-off at a neutral venue was played. If scores were level after ninety minutes in the play-off, then two fifteen-minute periods of extra time and, if necessary, a penalty shoot-out would determine the winners.

For FIFA World Cup qualifying stages using a home-and-away knockout format, the team that had the higher aggregate score over the two legs progressed to the next round. In the event that aggregate scores finished level, the away goals rule was applied (i.e. the team that scored more goals away from home over the two legs progressed). If away goals were also equal, then thirty minutes of extra time were played, divided into two fifteen-minutes halves. The away goals rule was again applied after extra time (i.e. if there were goals scored during extra time and the aggregate score was still level, the visiting team qualified by virtue of more away goals scored). If no goals were scored during extra time, the tie was decided via a penalty shoot-out.

Confederation qualification

AFC

Qualification began with two sets of two-leg knockout qualification rounds – the first held on 29 June and 2 July and 3 July 2011 and the second on 23 and 28 July – reducing the number of teams in the main draw to 20. The draw for the first two rounds of qualifiers was held in Kuala Lumpur on 30 March 2011.

As in the 2010 format, the third stage consisted of 5 groups of 4 teams (with matches held between September 2011 and February 2012) with the top 2 in each group advancing to 2 groups of 5 that played a further group stage during 2012. The top two teams in each group qualified for the 2014 World Cup directly, while the two third-placed teams engaged in a play-off tie for a chance to qualify via a further inter-confederation qualifying tie against a team from CONMEBOL.

The qualification process began with 43 national teams (out of 46 AFC members; Bhutan, Brunei and Guam did not enter) vying for four and a half spots. 4 nations have qualified: Japan, Australia, Iran and Korea Republic. Jordan beat Uzbekistan in round 5 and played Uruguay, the fifth-placed team from CONMEBOL, for the right to qualify, where they were eliminated.

Final positions (fourth round)

Play-off for 5th place (fifth round)

|}

CAF

52 out of the 53 national associations affiliated to CAF entered the qualifying tournament to determine the continent's five slots for the next World Cup (only Mauritania failed to enter, while South Sudan joined FIFA after the start of qualifying).

Qualification began with a first round of 12 two-legged knockout ties, which were held between 11 and 16 November 2011. The ties involved the 24 lowest-ranked teams according to FIFA world rankings. The 12 winners joined the remaining 28 CAF entrants in the second round, which consisted of 10 groups of four. The winners of each group – held between June 2012 and September 2013 – advanced to a third round of 5 two-legged knockout ties. The five winners of these ties – held in October and November 2013 – advanced to the 2014 FIFA World Cup finals.

Third round

|}

CONCACAF

In May 2010, the CONCACAF Executive Committee announced a possible change in its qualifying format for the 2014 World Cup, which would start with a preliminary knockout stage followed by three group phases. However, these proposals were abandoned. CONCACAF once again used a six-team final stage (known colloquially as "the Hexagonal"). The ten lowest-ranked nations played two-legged ties, with the five winners joining the nations ranked 7–25 in Round 2. There were six groups of four teams, with the six group winners joining the nations ranked 1–6 in Round 3. There were three groups of four teams and the top two teams in each group advanced to Round 4. These six nations formed one group, with the top three teams qualifying and Mexico, the fourth-placed team, advancing to the inter-continental play-off against New Zealand, the top team from the OFC.

A total of 35 national teams began the qualification process vying for three and a half spots. 31 nations were eliminated and the Bahamas withdrew (because their stadium was not completed in time for the competition).

Final positions (fourth round)

CONMEBOL

As Brazil has already qualified as host, the remaining nine CONMEBOL teams took part in a double round-robin group, playing each other twice (home and away) using the same schedule as previous qualification tournaments (each team had a bye on the date they would normally be scheduled to play Brazil). The top four teams qualified automatically, whereas Uruguay, the fifth-placed team, proceeded to the inter-confederational play-off against Jordan, the fifth placed team from Asia.

Final positions

OFC

The four lowest-ranked nations (American Samoa, Cook Islands, Samoa, and Tonga) competed in the first round of qualifying: a single round-robin tournament in Apia, Samoa, from 22 to 26 November 2011. The winners of the group, Samoa, joined the remaining 7 OFC teams in the 2012 OFC Nations Cup, which also doubled as the second qualifying round. The four semi-finalists of the OFC Nations Cup advanced to the third round, which consisted of a double round-robin held on a home-and-away basis between 7 September 2012 and 26 March 2013.

New Zealand, as the winners of the third round, proceeded to the inter-confederation play-off against Mexico, the fourth-placed team from CONCACAF, where they were eliminated by a strong Mexico side who beat them 9–3 over two legs.

Final positions (third round)

UEFA

The European qualification games started in September 2012, after Euro 2012. All 53 national associations affiliated with UEFA took part in the qualification process. In round one, teams competed in eight groups of six teams and a single group of five teams. The nine group winners qualified, while the eight best runners-up – ranked according to all their games except for games against the sixth-placed team in their group – entered into the play-offs for the four remaining spots.

Final positions (first round)

Second round

The Second Round was contested by the top eight runners-up. The second round draw took place at the headquarters of FIFA in Zürich, Switzerland, on 21 October. October 2013 FIFA World Rankings were used to decide which of the teams were seeded. The matches were played on 15 and 19 November 2013.

Group runners-up
The eight best group runners-up contested the second round, where they were paired into four two-legged (home-and-away) fixtures. The four winners qualified for the 2014 FIFA World Cup. Because one group had one team fewer than the others, matches against the last-placed team in each of the six-team groups were not included in this ranking. Teams were ranked by the following parameters in order:
 Highest number of points
 Goal difference
 Highest number of goals scored

|}

Inter-confederation play-offs

There were two scheduled inter-confederation playoffs to determine the final two qualification spots to the finals. The first legs were played on 13 November 2013, and the second legs were played on 20 November 2013.

AFC v CONMEBOL

CONCACAF v OFC

Top goalscorers
There were 2,344 goals scored over 820 games, for an average of 2.86 goals per game.

11 goals
  Deon McCaulay
  Robin van Persie
  Luis Suárez

10 goals
  Peter Byers
  Lionel Messi
  Edin Džeko
  Oribe Peralta
  Blas Pérez

9 goals
  Gonzalo Higuaín
  Radamel Falcao
  Jerry Bengtson

8 goals
  Vedad Ibišević
  Álvaro Saborío
  Mesut Özil
  Shinji Okazaki
  Georges Gope-Fenepej
  Cristiano Ronaldo
  Zlatan Ibrahimović
  Clint Dempsey

Notes

References

External links

 2014 FIFA World Cup Brazil matches and results at FIFA.com
 Live Preliminary Draw

 
Qualification
FIFA World Cup qualification